Big Hill Farmstead Historic District is a historic home and farm and national historic district located at Jackson, Cape Girardeau County, Missouri.  The farmhouse was built about 1855, and is a two-story, five bay, brick I-house with Greek Revival and Italianate style design elements. It has a hipped roof and features a gallery porch. Other contributing elements are the a timber frame barn (c. 1855), a cabin/workshop (c. 1856), a wagon shed (c. 1870s), and the surrounding farmland.

It was listed on the National Register of Historic Places in 1999.

References

Historic districts on the National Register of Historic Places in Missouri
Farms on the National Register of Historic Places in Missouri
Greek Revival houses in Missouri
Italianate architecture in Missouri
Historic districts in Cape Girardeau County, Missouri
National Register of Historic Places in Cape Girardeau County, Missouri